Elles Maria Leferink (born 14 November 1976 in Weerselo, Overijssel) is a volleyball player from the Netherlands, who represented her native country at the 1996 Summer Olympics in Atlanta, Georgia, finishing in fifth place.

Leferink was a leading youngster in the Netherlands national team that won the gold medal at the 1995 European Championship by defeating Croatia 3–0 in the final.

Among other awards she was elected "best player of Europe" aged 19 in 1995 and "best server" at the World Championship 1998 and the European Championship in 2003.

She retired in 2007, becoming a mother.

Individual awards
 1995 CEV "European Volleyball Player of the Year"
 1998 World Championship "Best Server"
 2003 European Championship "Best Server"

References
  Dutch Olympic Committee

1976 births
Dutch women's volleyball players
Volleyball players at the 1996 Summer Olympics
Olympic volleyball players of the Netherlands
Sportspeople from Overijssel
People from Weerselo
Living people